Archivolva is a genus of sea snails, marine gastropod mollusks in the family Ovulidae.

Species
Species within the genus Archivolva include:
Archivolva alexbrownii Lorenz, 2012 
Archivolva clava (Habe, 1991)
Archivolva kahlbrocki Lorenz, 2009
Archivolva lissenungensis (Lorenz, 2005)

References

Ovulidae
Gastropod genera